The 2005 MBNA NASCAR RacePoints 400 28th stock car race of the 2005 NASCAR Nextel Cup Series season, the second race of the 2005 Chase for the Nextel Cup, and the 37th iteration of the event. The race was held on Sunday, September 25, 2005, before a crowd of 150,000 in Dover, Delaware at Dover International Speedway, a 1-mile (1.6 km) permanent oval-shaped racetrack. The race was extended from its scheduled 400 laps to 404 due to a green–white–checker finish. On the final restart, Jimmie Johnson, driving for Hendrick Motorsports, would fend off the field in a fierce restart to take the Chase for the Nextel Cup lead in the standings. The win was Johnson's 17th career NASCAR Nextel Cup Series victory and his third of the season. To fill out the podium, Kyle Busch, driving for Hendrick Motorsports, and Rusty Wallace, driving for Penske-Jasper Racing, would finish second and third, respectively.

Background 

Dover International Speedway is an oval race track in Dover, Delaware, United States that has held at least two NASCAR races since it opened in 1969. In addition to NASCAR, the track also hosted USAC and the NTT IndyCar Series. The track features one layout, a 1-mile (1.6 km) concrete oval, with 24° banking in the turns and 9° banking on the straights. The speedway is owned and operated by Dover Motorsports.

The track, nicknamed "The Monster Mile", was built in 1969 by Melvin Joseph of Melvin L. Joseph Construction Company, Inc., with an asphalt surface, but was replaced with concrete in 1995. Six years later in 2001, the track's capacity moved to 135,000 seats, making the track have the largest capacity of sports venue in the mid-Atlantic. In 2002, the name changed to Dover International Speedway from Dover Downs International Speedway after Dover Downs Gaming and Entertainment split, making Dover Motorsports. From 2007 to 2009, the speedway worked on an improvement project called "The Monster Makeover", which expanded facilities at the track and beautified the track. After the 2014 season, the track's capacity was reduced to 95,500 seats.

Entry list 

 (R) denotes rookie driver.

Practice

First practice 
The first practice session was held on Friday, September 23, at 11:00 AM EST. The session would last for two hours.

Second practice 
The second practice session was held on Saturday, September 24, at 9:30 AM EST. The session would last for 45 minutes.

Third and final practice 
The final practice session, sometimes referred to as Happy Hour, was held on Saturday, September 24, at 11:10 AM EST. The session would last for 45 minutes.

Qualifying 
Qualifying was held on Friday, September 23, at 3:10 PM EST. Each driver would have two laps to set a fastest time; the fastest of the two would count as their official qualifying lap.

Five drivers would fail to qualify: Morgan Shepherd, Hermie Sadler, Ryan McGlynn, Joey McCarthy, and Wayne Anderson.

Full qualifying results

Race results

Standings after the race 

Drivers' Championship standings

Note: Only the first 10 positions are included for the driver standings.

References 

2005 NASCAR Nextel Cup Series
NASCAR races at Dover Motor Speedway
September 2005 sports events in the United States
2005 in sports in Delaware